The Nordic is a German emergency tow vessel (ETV) stationed on an offshore position north of the East Frisian island of Norderney. It is the most powerful tugboat in German waters, operated by Fairplay Towage Group.

History

Construction and commissioning

The construction and commissioning of the Nordic were a consequence of the Pallas accident off Amrum island in 1998 when the cargo vessel ran aground and lost a substantial amount of oil. Especially the  Schutzgemeinschaft Deutsche Nordsee association and many other non-governmental organisations for the protection of the environment had worked towards the commissioning of a new emergency tow vessel on the German North Sea coast.

Constructions began on 27 October 2009 on the P+S Werften yards, formerly known as Peene-Werft, in Wolgast, Mecklenburg-Western Pomerania, with yard number 563. Sea trials were held in October 2010. In the course of these trials, the Nordic delivered a bollard pull of 207 tons (ca. 2,030 kN). After its completion on 15 November 2010 and the christening on 8 December 2010 by Susanne Ramsauer, the wife of Federal German Minister of Transport Peter Ramsauer, the ship replaced the salvage tug Oceanic which was decommissioned after 41 years in service on New Year's Day 2011. Unofficially, the construction costs of the Nordic were said to have been about € 50 million.

Operation
The Nordic is owned by NORTUG Bereederungs GmbH & Co. KG which is partially held by the members of the German consortium Arbeitsgemeinschaft Küstenschutz. The ship is operated by Fairplay (after merger with the former operatior Bugsier-, Reederei- und Bergungsgesellschaft) who charter the tow vessel to the Federal Ministry of Transport, Building and Urban Development for an initial time of ten years and a fee of €114 million. The operational base is Cuxhaven on the mouth of the river Elbe. With a maximum speed of  the Nordic is able to reach any stricken vessel in German North Sea waters within two hours.

In order to be able to operate in a contaminated atmosphere, the ship has been fitted with superstructures that can be sealed tight and are explosion-proof.

Engine and propulsion 
The ship is fitted with two MTU 20V8000M71L plants in an anti-gas operational mode, two MTU 12V4000 auxiliary engines for driving the two main electrical generators and another Diesel engine by MAN which powers the emergency generator.

The Nordic has been prepared to operate in a flammable or harmful atmosphere, e.g. after a tanker accident. Among other safety measures, such cases involve the shutting down of the turbochargers so that compressed air inside them may not be ignited. However, this reduces the engine power.

The propulsion is diesel-mechanical via a gearbox and shaft device by Flender AG onto two controllable-pitch propellers by Berg Propulsion which are mounted inside Kort nozzle frames.

See also
Baltic, the Nordic's equivalent in the Baltic Sea.

References

Further reading

Tugboats of Germany
2010 ships
Ships built in Wolgast